August Stähelin (16 September 1812 – 28 September 1886) was a Swiss politician and President of the Swiss Council of States (1857/1858).

External links 
 
 

1812 births
1886 deaths
Politicians from Basel-Stadt
Swiss Calvinist and Reformed Christians
Members of the Council of States (Switzerland)
Presidents of the Council of States (Switzerland)